Notocelia roborana is a moth of the family Tortricidae. It is found from Europe to eastern Russia. It is also found in Asia Minor, Iran, Mongolia and China (Xinjiang).

The wingspan is 16–22 mm. The forewings are dark brown at the base and  greyish-white to  the tip in a wide band covering slightly above half the wing surface. The species is very similar to the related species Notocelia rosaecolana and Notocelia trimaculana.

Adults are on wing from late June to early August.

The larvae feed on Rosa, Rubus (including raspberry), Prunus spinosa, Crataegus, Myrica gale and Quercus. The larvae damage cultivated roses, spinning the leaves of a shoot tightly together and eating out the heart, sometimes attacking the flower buds.

References

External links
Eurasian Tortricidae 

Eucosmini
Moths of Europe
Insects of Turkey
Moths described in 1775